Calipso TV is a Venezuelan community television channel.  It was created in December 2003 and can be seen in the community of Ciudad Guayana in the Caroni Municipality of the Bolivar State of Venezuela on UHF channel 69.  Ruben Vivas is the legal representative of the foundation that owns this channel.

See also
List of Venezuelan television channels

External links
 Calipso TV website

Television networks in Venezuela
Television stations in Venezuela
Television channels and stations established in 2003
2003 establishments in Venezuela
Television in Venezuela
Spanish-language television stations